Otto Tumlirz, or Ota Tumlíř (23 July 1890, Rožmberk nad Vltavou – 3 January 1957, Graz) was a Czech-Austrian psychologist, researcher for pedagogy. He taught as a professor at the Graz University.

Literary works 
 Jugendkunde, 2 vols., 1920–1921
 Probleme der Charakterologie, 1928
 Pädagogische Psychologie, 1930
 Jugendpsychologie der Gegenwart, ²1933
 Abriss der Jugendkunde und Charakterkunde, 1940

External links 
 AEIOU

Czech psychologists
Austrian psychologists
Austrian people of Czech descent
People from Český Krumlov District
1890 births
1957 deaths
Academic staff of the University of Graz
Austrian people of German Bohemian descent
20th-century psychologists